José Luis González (born 11 September 1997) is an Argentine rugby union player who plays for the in the Rugby Pro D2. His playing position is hooker. He also represented Argentina XV ten times between 2017 and 2019. His performances saw him named in the Argentina squad for the 2020 and 2021 internationals.

Reference list

External links
itsrugby.co.uk profile

1997 births
Argentine rugby union players
Living people
Stade Montois players
Rugby union hookers
Dogos XV players